David Bustamante Hoyos (born 25 March 1982) is a Spanish pop singer and songwriter.

He gained his initial fame in 2001 as a third-place winner on Operación Triunfo, the interactive musical reality television show that went on to achieve the highest audience ratings in the history of Spanish TV.

Bustamante has sold more than 2 million records—albums and singles combined—in Spain and Latin America, getting 15 Platinum in albums, digital downloads and mobile ringtones. By 2019, nine of his ten albums had reached number one in Spain.

His latest hit is "Héroes" (2019).

Biography

2001–2003: Operación Triunfo and Bustamante 
David Bustamante is among the promising Latin pop singers who emerged in Spain in the early 2000s.

Bustamante's breakthrough was in the TV hit Operación Triunfo in 2001. This show broke ratings records as well as dominated the top position of the CD sales charts during its 5-month run. The singer was in his late teens when he became the third finalist of this successful contest. Bustamante went on to sign with Vale Music Spain and Universal Music Latino.

His debut album, Bustamante, was released in Spain in May 2002 and in Latin America and the United States in 2003. The album became a big seller, thanks in part to the singles "Además de ti", "El aire que me das" or "Dos hombres y un destino". Another highlight of that album was "Perdóname", a duet with Puerto Rican pop star Luis Fonsi. He followed the promotion with a successful summer tour with over 70 concerts throughout Spain.

2004–2005: Así soy yo and Caricias al alma 
In 2004, Bustamante followed up his first album with his sophomore outing, Así soy yo (That's the way I am), which was – for the most part – produced by the well-known Emilio Estefan in Miami. It was also in 2004 that Bustamante recorded the intoxicating theme song of "Gitanas", a superb, highly thought-provoking telenovela (Latin soap opera) that was filmed in Mexico and ran on the Telemundo network (NBC's contribution to Spanish-language programming) in the United States.

Bustamante continued with Caricias al alma in 2005. The album was another success in Spain and other countries of Latin America like Venezuela, where it was certificated Gold. Caricias al alma was recorded in Italy and Spain and included the summer hit "Devuélveme la vida". Furthermore, he visited Latin America to promote his music.

2006–2010: Pentimento, Al filo de la irrealidad and A contracorriente 
Bustamante's success continued with Pentimento (2006), Al Filo de la Irrealidad (2008) and A Contracorriente (2010) all reaching the top of the Spanish Album chart and going Platinum. With all this albums, Bustamante has promoted his music throughout Spain, Latin America and some European countries. He had success with some singles like "Cobarde", "Por ella" or "A contracorriente". During this time, he made several spring, summer and winter tours.

2011–2015: Mio and Vivir 
2011's Mio, produced by Christian Leuzzi (Celine Dion's producer) and Mauri Stern reached Platinum status and helped the singer's total sales figures approach the two million mark. Mio includes a duet with the copla, flamenco, pop star Pastora Soler. In 2012 and 2013 he toured Spain and served as a coach on the first and second season of the Spanish talent show El Número Uno.

In 2014 Bustamante released the studio album Vivir. The first single is the hit "Feliz". During the Christmas break, he presented Fuera de clase, a TV-show on La 1, the flagship television channel of Spanish public broadcaster Televisión Española (TVE). The channel also aired a music TV special gala dedicated to his career on Christmas Eve.

2016–2017: Amor de los dos 
Amor de los dos is the ninth studio album by Bustamante and it was released in June 2016 by Universal Music. The album reached number one in Spain and features guest vocals from Alejandro Fernández, Edith Márquez and Alicia Villareal. He performed a duet with the Mexican singer Anahí in the song "La Puerta de Alcalá" for the album Inesperado (2016).

2018–2019: Héroes en tiempos de guerra 
In January 2019, Bustamante unveiled his brand new single, Héroes. In February 2019, he released his tenth studio Héroes en tiempos de guerra (Universal Music) featuring guest vocals from Ana Guerra, among others.

He serves as advisor for Luis Fonsi on La Voz (Antena 3).

In other ventures, he has released six fragrances with Puig.

Music style 

He is not part of Spain's nuevo flamenco scene. The vocalist, does, however, incorporate elements of Spanish flamenco and Spanish gypsy music at times – and he has his share of Latin American influences as well, including Afro-Cuban salsa and Colombian cumbia.

But Bustamante is not a flamenco, salsa, or cumbia artist in the strict sense – his music is Latin pop first and foremost. Romantic pop ballads are one of his strong points. Some of Bustamante's admirers have described him as a Spanish equivalent of Ricky Martin or salsa romantica star Marc Anthony—both of whom are, to a degree, valid comparisons, although Bustamante has a recognizable style of his own and sings with a distinctively Spanish accent. Because of the way he pronounces certain words, anyone who speaks Spanish will be able to tell that Bustamante is from Spain instead of Latin America. He has been compared in style with other artists like Enrique Iglesias, Luis Fonsi or Cristian Castro.

Bustamante only uses his last name as a recording artist.

Personal life
On 22 July 2006 he married the Spanish actress and model, Paula Echevarría in the Basílica de Santa María la Real de Covadonga in Asturias. On 17 August 2008, the couple's first child, a girl, was born. The couple divorced in March 2018.

Discography

Studio albums

References

External links
David Bustamante - Official Website

1982 births
Living people
People from the Western Coast of Cantabria
Singers from Cantabria
Star Academy participants
Operación Triunfo contestants
21st-century Spanish singers
21st-century Spanish male singers